Mamit Vanlalduatsanga (born 15 December 1996) is an Indian professional footballer who plays as a defender for Churchill Brothers in the I-League.

Career 
Mamit made his professional debut for the Aizawl against Shillong Lajong on 28 October 2018. He started and played full match as Aizawl lost 2–1.

Career statistics

References

1996 births
Living people
People from Mamit
Indian footballers
Churchill Brothers FC Goa players 
Aizawl FC players 
Footballers from Mizoram
I-League players
India youth international footballers
Association football fullbacks